Desert Bloom is a 1986 American drama film directed by Eugene Corr and starring an ensemble cast led by Jon Voight and JoBeth Williams. It was screened in the Un Certain Regard section at the 1986 Cannes Film Festival and funded through the Sundance Film Festival Institute.

Plot
Six years after World War II has ended, Jack Chismore, a veteran suffering from PTSD, runs a gas station in Las Vegas, Nevada.

Jack is married to Lily, and stepfather to Lily's three daughters including Rose, a teenager at an impressionable age. Lily's sister, Starr, has come to Las Vegas for a quick divorce and comes to live with them, upsetting the routine of what is already a small and cramped house.

Lily lands a job with the Atomic Testing Office and cannot tell Jack or the girls when the military is conducting atomic-bomb testing in the desert region nearby. This embitters and frustrates Jack, who takes his anger out on Rose many times.

When Rose runs away, it is Jack who shows the most courage and concern.

Cast
 Annabeth Gish as Rose Chismore
 Jon Voight as Jack Chismore
 JoBeth Williams as Lily Chismore
 Ellen Barkin as Aunt Starr
 Jay Underwood as Robin (as Jay D. Underwood)
 Desiree Joseph as Dee Ann Chismore
 Dusty Balcerzak as Barbara Jo Chismore
 Allen Garfield as Mr. Mosol
 Tressi Loria as Shelly
 Laura Rasmussen as Meryl
 William Lang as Colonel
 Jim McCarthy as Driver
 Ann Risley as Mrs. Muratore

Reception
In the Chicago Sun-Times, critic Roger Ebert wrote:Desert Bloom contains the material for a very good film and it certainly contains the performances, but it moves in too many directions and contains too many issues. It's about the bomb, McCarthyism, the role of women, alcoholism and child abuse, and it's a wonder it doesn't get around to gambling.<p>
There are scenes that start out as perfectly observed moments and end up as a series of speeches as the movie tries to keep track of all of its issues. If they had just gone through and strengthened the characters and allowed the messages to find themselves, they would have really had something here.

References

External links

1986 films
1986 drama films
American drama films
Carson Productions films
Columbia Pictures films
Films about domestic violence
Films scored by Brad Fiedel
Films about post-traumatic stress disorder
1980s English-language films
1980s American films